Lanuvian was an archaic Latino-Faliscan language.

References

Bibliography
 Conway, Robert Seymour. The Italic Dialects. Cambridge University Press. 1897. p. 329.
 Donati, A. Sull’iscrizione lanuviana della curia mulierum. «RSA», I (1971). pp. 235-237.

Latino-Faliscan languages